Goldfarb School of Nursing at Barnes–Jewish College is a college of nursing located in St. Louis. It has two campuses: one on the campus of Missouri Baptist Medical Center and another at Washington University's Medical School and Barnes-Jewish hospital campus.

The college was founded in 1902 as Jewish Hospital School of Nursing and was the first school in the nation accredited by the National League of Nursing.

Barnes Hospital School of Nursing was founded in 1955 after Washington University closed its affiliated nursing program. The school later lent its name to the University of Missouri - St. Louis becoming Barnes College of Nursing at University of Missouri - St. Louis.

In 2005, Barnes College merged with Jewish Hospital School of Nursing to become Barnes-Jewish College of Nursing and Allied Health. A private donation from Alvin Goldfarb, in 2007, began a new era in nursing education at Barnes-Jewish College. Goldfarb School of Nursing at Barnes-Jewish College, in 2011, opened a second location on the Missouri Baptist Medical Center campus.

Goldfarb has a nationally recognized educational facility with advanced technology in classrooms, lecture halls and simulation labs.

Goldfarb School of Nursing at Barnes-Jewish College partners with top health care and educational institutions within the BJC HealthCare system and beyond to support its mission of advancing learning, research and innovation within the healing profession.

Barnes-Jewish College and the Goldfarb School of Nursing are fully accredited by the Commission on Collegiate Nursing Education (CCNE) and by the Higher Learning Commission of the North Central Association of Colleges and Schools (NCA). It also has approval from the Missouri Coordinator Board for Higher Education (MCBHE).

Notes

External links
Official website

Washington University in St. Louis
Central West End, St. Louis
Educational institutions established in 1902
1902 establishments in Missouri
Nursing schools in Missouri